Trembleur Lake Provincial Park is a provincial park in British Columbia, Canada.

Trembleur Lake Provincial Park is a part of the larger preserved area, known as the Stuart-Trembleur-Takla Lakes boating system, a waterway of nearly 300 kilometers. Trembleur Lake, after which the park is named, is a pristine lake nearly 50 kilometres in length. The lake and park offer a spectacular wilderness setting and recreational activities such as boating, hunting, and angling.

References

Provincial parks of British Columbia
Regional District of Bulkley-Nechako